Rodrigo de Beniambras or Rodrigo di Beniambras (died 1535) was a Roman Catholic prelate who served as Bishop of Santorini (1527–1535).

Biography
On 11 Mar 1527, Rodrigo de Beniambras was appointed during the papacy of Pope Clement VII as Bishop of Santorini.
He served as Bishop of Santorini until his death in 1535.

References 

16th-century Roman Catholic bishops in the Republic of Venice
Bishops appointed by Pope Clement VII
1535 deaths